W.A.K.O. European Championships 1980 were the fourth European kickboxing championships hosted by the W.A.K.O. organization.  The championships were open to amateur men based in Europe and for the first time ever (in European championships), each country had one competitor only per weight division.  The styles on offer were Full-Contact and Semi-Contact.  By the end of the championships, West Germany had the largest haul of medals, with host nation Great Britain in second, and Italy in third place.  The event was held at the Wembley Centre in London, England, UK.

Men's Full-Contact Kickboxing

The Full-Contact category in London had seven weight divisions ranging from 57 kg/125.4 lbs to over 84 kg/+184.8 lbs, with all bouts fought under Full-Contact rules.  More detail on Full-Contact's rules-set can be found at the W.A.K.O. website, although be aware that the rules have changed since 1980.  The medal winners of each division are shown below with future K-1 world champion Branko Cikatić winning his second W.A.K.O. European championships, as did West German fighter Klaus Friedhaber.  By the end of the championships, West Germany were the strongest nation in Full-Contact with two golds, narrowly fending off hosts Great Britain who won one gold, three silvers and one bronze.

Men's Full-Contact Kickboxing Medals Table

Men's Semi-Contact Kickboxing

The Semi-Contact category differed from Full-Contact in that fights were won on points given to superior skill, speed and technique and physical force was limited - more information on Semi-Contact can be found on the W.A.K.O. website, although the rules will have changed since 1980.  There were seven weight divisions in Semi-Contact in London, ranging from 57 kg/125.4 lbs to over 84 kg/+184.8 lbs.  By the end of the championships, West Germany were the most successful nation in Semi-Contact, winning three gold medals and two bronze.

Men's Semi-Contact Kickboxing Medals Table

Overall Medals Standing (Top 5)

See also
List of WAKO Amateur European Championships
List of WAKO Amateur World Championships

References

External links
 WAKO World Association of Kickboxing Organizations Official Site

WAKO Amateur European Championships events
Kickboxing in the United Kingdom
1980 in kickboxing
Sport in the London Borough of Brent